BCA Research Inc. is an independent provider of global investment research and investment strategy advice. BCA was founded by A. Hamilton Bolton in 1949 in Montreal, Quebec, Canada. The firm is also known by the title of its first publication, The Bank Credit Analyst.

BCA Research provides economic analysis and trend forecasts of the major financial asset classes and geographic markets. These include equities, foreign exchange, fixed income and commodities & energy. The geographical coverage includes the US, Emerging Markets, Europe, China and Global strategies. BCA delivers the research through weekly bulletins, daily insights, special reports, proprietary market studies, chart packs and conferences.
BCA Research clients include portfolio managers, hedge funds, asset management firms, pension funds and endowments, central banks, security dealers, sovereign wealth funds, private banking, insurance companies, private equity firms, family offices and individual investors.

BCA Research has been recognized as a top independent investment research firm, both in North America, and Europe.

History 

The founder, A. Hamilton Bolton, was noted for his work on the Elliot Wave Theory, and published Money and Investment Profits, a book on investments and the business cycle, just prior to his death in 1967. He was succeeded by J. Anthony Boeckh, who led the company from 1968 to 2001.  During that time, Bolton's original work on supercycles was refined into what BCA calls the debt supercycle.

BCA Research was acquired by Metal Bulletin PLC in 2001.

Euromoney Institutional Investor PLC bought Metal Bulletin along with BCA Research in 2006.

References

External links 
 

Financial services companies of Canada
Companies based in Montreal